This is a list of local governments in Malaysia which have standing links to local communities in other countries. In most cases, the association, especially when formalised by local government, is known as "town twinning" (usually in Europe) or "sister cities" (usually in the rest of the world).

B
Beaufort
 Beaufort, United States

I
Ipoh
 Fukuoka, Japan

J
Johor Bahru

 Changzhou, China
 Istanbul, Turkey
 Kuching, Malaysia

K
Klang

 Ürümqi, China
 Yongzhou, China

Kota Bharu
 Kasaoka, Japan

Kota Kinabalu

 Hangzhou, China
 Heyuan, China
 Jiangmen, China

 Ratchaburi, Thailand

 Vladivostok, Russia
 Yeosu, South Korea
 Yongin, South Korea

Kuala Lumpur

 Ankara, Turkey
 Casablanca, Morocco
 Chennai, India
 Dubai, United Arab Emirates
 Isfahan, Iran
 Karachi, Pakistan
 London, England, United Kingdom
 Malacca City, Malaysia
 Mashhad, Iran

Kuala Terengganu
 Makassar, Indonesia

Kuantan
 Qinzhou, China

Kuching

 Jeddah, Saudi Arabia
 Johor Bahru, Malaysia
 Kunming, China
 Quanzhou, China
 Pontianak, Indonesia

L
Labuan
 Xianning, China

Langkawi
 Kish Island, Iran

M
Malacca City

 Haikou, China
 Hoorn, Netherlands
 Kota Tua (Jakarta), Indonesia
 Kuala Lumpur, Malaysia
 Nanjing, China
 Lisbon, Portugal
 Siak, Indonesia
 Valparaíso, Chile

Miri

 Guangning, China
 Hualien County, Taiwan

P
Padawan – Uma Bawang
 Berkeley, United States

Penang Island

 Adelaide, Australia
 Bangkok, Thailand
 Phuket, Thailand
 Medan, Indonesia
 Xiamen, China

Petaling Jaya

 Asan, South Korea
 Bandung, Indonesia

 Miyoshi, Japan

Putrajaya
 Astana, Kazakhstan

S
Sandakan

 Burwood, Australia
 Zamboanga City, Philippines

Seberang Perai
 Fremantle, Australia

Seremban
 Bukittinggi, Indonesia

Shah Alam

 Hanam, South Korea
 Surabaya, Indonesia

Sibu

 Fuqing, China
 Guangning, China
 Gulou (Fuzhou), China
 Gutian, China
 Jintang, China
 Minqing, China
 Nanping, China
 Ningde, China
 Pingnan, China
 Putian, China
 Puyang, China
 Qinghe, China
 Wuyishan, China

T
Tawau

 Parepare, Indonesia
 Zhangping, China

References

Malaysia
Lists of places in Malaysia
Populated places in Malaysia
Cities in Malaysia